Erfurt IV is an electoral constituency (German: Wahlkreis) represented in the Landtag of Thuringia. It elects one member via first-past-the-post voting. Under the current constituency numbering system, it is designated as constituency 27. It contains southeastern parts of Erfurt, the capital and largest city of Thuringia.

Erfurt IV was created in 1990 for the first state election. Since 2009, it has been represented by André Blechschmidt of The Left.

Geography
As of the 2019 state election, Erfurt IV is located entirely within the urban district of Erfurt. It covers the central and southwestern part of the city, specifically the city districts (Stadtteile) of Büßleben, Daberstedt, Dittelstedt, Egstedt, Herrenberg, Melchendorf, Niedernissa, Rohda (Haarberg), Urbich, Waltersleben, Wiesenhügel, and Windischholzhausen.

Members
The constituency was held by the Christian Democratic Union (CDU) from its creation in 1990 until 2004, during which time it was represented by Jörg Schwäblein. It was won by the Party of Democratic Socialism (PDS) in 2004, and represented by Tamara Thierbach. She was succeeded in 2009 by André Blechschmidt of The Left, successor party of the PDS. He was re-elected in 2014 and 2019.

Election results

2019 election

2014 election

2009 election

2004 election

1999 election

1994 election

1990 election

References

Electoral districts in Thuringia
Erfurt
1990 establishments in Germany
Constituencies established in 1990